The University of Chicago Graham School of Continuing Liberal and Professional Studies is one of eight professional schools of the University of Chicago. The Graham School's focus is on part-time and flexible programs of study.

The Graham School offers Master's degree programs, academic certificate programs, and a variety of credit and non-credit courses for graduate students at large, returning scholars, and adult learners. The Graham School manages the  Summer Session, a series of academic programs for high school students, visiting college students, and international students. It conducts lecture series and other programs throughout the year.

The school's administrative offices can be found on the University of Chicago's main campus in the Hyde Park neighborhood. Summer Session programs and some courses are also held on the main campus. The majority of courses are conducted at the University of Chicago Gleacher Center in downtown Chicago.

History

Founded alongside the University of Chicago in 1890, the University's continuing education division operated in similar fashion to the Chautauqua movement at Oxford and Cambridge, with instructors traveling by train to teach in surrounding communities. The continuing education branch was reformed in 1997 with a $10 million donation from William and Catherine Graham, upon which the name of the division was changed to the William B. and Catherine V. Graham School of General Studies. On July 1, 2011 the school updated its name to the University of Chicago Graham School of Continuing Liberal and Professional Studies.

Graduate Studies
The Graham School offers four Master's degrees and for-credit graduate-level courses through the Graduate Student-at-Large program:
 Master of Science in Analytics
 Master of Science in Biomedical Informatics
 Master of Liberal Arts
 Master of Science in Threat and Response Management
 Graduate Student-at-Large

The Graham School also offers graduate coursework without enrolling in a degree program through its Graduate Student-at-Large and Returning Scholar programs. Graduate students-at-large take University of Chicago graduate courses for grades and build a transferable record of study for matriculation into a degree program at the University of Chicago or elsewhere. Returning scholars audit University of Chicago courses, but are not graded for their work and do not build a transferable record of study.

Certificate Programs

Graham School certificate programs span a wide variety of topics from integrated marketing courses to liberal arts and humanities and are offered on a part-time basis. Upon completion of requirements, a certificate stating mastery of the given area is earned by the student. Because most courses are open-enrollment, students may take certificate courses without enrolling in a certificate program. These certificate programs fall under two broad categories: (1) Humanities, Arts, and Sciences and (2) Professional Programs.

Humanities Arts and Sciences provides intensive study on a specific, grounded in the tenets of a liberal arts education. The Basic Program of Liberal Education for Adults, modeled after the University of Chicago Common Core, exposes students to the Great Books of antiquity and the Socratic method of teaching and discussion.

The Humanities, Arts, and Sciences program offers certificates in the "Basic Program of Liberal Education for Adults."

Professional Programs are short, intensive seminars aimed at students in the workforce. They offer educational expansion opportunities in 11 areas relevant to the modern business world.  Upon completion of the required number of courses, a certificate showing the student's mastery of the particular skill set involved is awarded.

The Professional Program offers certificates in the following areas:

 Clinical Trials Management and Regulatory Compliance
 Conscious Leadership and Team Management
 Data Analytics for Business Professionals
 Digital Marketing and Integrated Communications

 Editing
 Financial Management and Decision-Making
 Medical Writing and Editing
Medical Physics
 Project Management

Non-credit Courses

The Graham School's non-credit offerings cover a wide variety of topics and are aimed at the college graduate who wishes to either expand their knowledge of a certain area or learn a marketable job skill.  Non-credit courses are offered in the following areas:

Basic Program of Liberal Education for Adults
Know Your Chicago
Museum Publishing Seminar
Open-to-All Courses in the Liberal Arts
 The Writer's Studio
 A Fortnight in Oxford

Courses in certificate programs may also be taken, without enrolling in the certificate program.

Urban Teacher Education Program
The Graham School operates the Urban Teacher Education Program (UTEP) for Chicago Public Schools teachers. UTEP is a five-year program; students first go through a two-year Master of Arts in Teaching and licensure program, then a three-year series of "post-graduation supports."

Summer Session
Summer Session is open to anyone who wishes to attend, though participants are divided by academic standing.  Courses run from the middle of June in four sessions that last anywhere from three to nine weeks. Students live in the University's Max Palevsky Residential Commons and are supervised by Residential Heads and student Resident Assistants.

Public Events
The Graham School offers multiple lecture series open to the public.

References

Schools of the University of Chicago